Matsuhime Pass (1,250 m) is a mountain pass in between Otsuki and Kosuge(Yamanashi Prefecture/Japan).

Outline 
The mountain pass is named Matsuhime Tōge, because  Matsuhime who is a daughter of Shingen Takeda passed through the mountain pass when she got away from an army of Nobunaga Oda in the Sengoku period.

At present, Japan National Route 139 which is an old road is passed through the mountain pass. The old road has been narrow (one lane going each way) and winding, because the area is a steep topo. But, got rid of rough road because Matsuhime Tunnel (3066m) which belongs to Matsuhime Bypass (3800m) opened in 2014.

Furthermore, as the Matsuhime Bypass (3800m) was open to traffic as a new road of Japan National Route 139 in 2014, the old road was closed due to reconstruction in between March and September on 2015. And, the old road had been possible to utilize since October 2015 until 2019. But, the old road has been closed due to danger of falling rocks and landslide since 2019. But, the safety of a partly section of old road was confirmed in 2020. From the above reason, the mountain pass has been possible to be approached by car from only Kosuge, Yamanashi since 2020.

Surrounding area 
 Fukashiro Dam
 Kazunogawa Dam

Transportation 
Access to the mountain pass, is only a bus route.
Matsuhime Bus stop

References

External links 
 Yamanashi Tourist
 Telemeter

Mountain passes of Japan